Nevenka "Nela" Eržišnik (née Maras; 18 June 1922 – 14 August 2007) was a Croatian actress.

Born in Banja Luka as Nevenka Maras, she appeared in some classic Croatian films of the 1950s and early 1960s. Later, she switched to television and built a reputation as one of the rare female stand-up comedians in Croatia or Yugoslavia. Her most memorable character was that of cleaning lady Marica Hrdalo.

Filmography

External links

1922 births
2007 deaths
People from Banja Luka
Croats of Bosnia and Herzegovina
Croatian comedians
Croatian film actresses
20th-century comedians
Yugoslav actresses